The New and Emerging Respiratory Virus Threats Advisory Group (NERVTAG) is an advisory body that advises the United Kingdom Government's Chief Medical Advisor / Chief Medical Officer for England, who in turn advises the UK Department of Health and Social Care and relevant ministers regarding threats from viral respiratory tract infections. The body replaced the UK Scientific Pandemic Influenza Advisory Committee (SPI) as part of a move to expand the scope to cover the threat of other respiratory viruses, besides pandemic influenza. The inaugural meeting was held on 19 December 2014 where the terms of reference were agreed. The group has been advising the Department of Health for some years and minutes of meetings are now regularly published, backdated to 2014. , the group has been advising specifically on the COVID-19 pandemic.

Developments 
On 18 December 2020, a telecon meeting took place where the SARS-Cov-2 variant, Variant of Concern 202012/01, was discussed.
A summary recorded in the advisory group's minutes stated that they had "moderate confidence" that there was "a substantial increase in transmissibility" with Variant of Concern 202012/01 over other variants. A summary presented to the United Kingdom Government's Scientific Advisory Group for Emergencies on 21 January 2021 recorded "a realistic possibility that infection with VOCB.1.1.7 is associated with an increased risk of death compared to infection with non-VOC viruses".

Members 
, its members were:
 Professor Peter Horby (Chair), epidemiologist, University of Oxford
 Professor Wendy Barclay, virologist, Imperial College London
 Professor Robert Dingwall, sociologist, Dingwall Enterprises Ltd. and Nottingham Trent University
 Professor John Edmunds, epidemiologist, London School of Hygiene and Tropical Medicine
 Dr Cariad Evans, Sheffield Teaching Hospitals NHS Foundation Trust
 Professor Neil Ferguson, epidemiologist, Medical Research Council, Imperial College London
 Professor Andrew Hayward, epidemiologist, University College London
 Dr Benjamin Killingley, medical consultant, University College London Hospitals NHS Foundation Trust
 Professor Wei Shen Lim, medical consultant, Nottingham University Hospitals NHS Trust
 Dr Jim McMenamin, immunologist, Health Protection Scotland
 Professor Peter Openshaw, immunologist, Imperial College London
 Dr James Rubin, psychologist, King's College London
 Professor Calum Semple, consultant paediatrician, University of Liverpool
 Dr Chloe Sellwood (Co-opted Member), Pandemic Flu Lead at NHS England
 Professor Ian Brown (Co-opted Member), virologist, Animal and Plant Health Agency (APHA)

See also 
 Scientific Advisory Group for Emergencies
 Advisory Committee on Dangerous Pathogens
 Joint Committee on Vaccination and Immunisation
 Vaccine Taskforce (UK)

References

External links 
 

Emergency management in the United Kingdom
Diseases and disorders in the United Kingdom
COVID-19 pandemic in the United Kingdom
National responses to the COVID-19 pandemic
Organizations associated with the COVID-19 pandemic